Michel Cormier (born May 28, 1974) is a National Hockey League linesman, who wears uniform number 76.

Career
Growing up, Cormier played junior ice hockey before ending his career with the Quebec Major Junior Hockey League (QMJHL). However, after ending his playing career he wished to return as a linesman. After only a few years refereeing, Cormier was hired by the QMJHL as a linesman. After officiating the 2003 World Junior Hockey Championship and the Memorial Cup, he was offered a full-time position as a National Hockey League (NHL) referee. He officiated his first career NHL game on October 10, 2003, in a game between the Pittsburgh Penguins and Los Angeles Kings. His first time officiating an NHL Playoff Game was on April 22, 2006, between the New York Rangers and New Jersey Devils. On December 2, 2018, Cormier officiated his 1,000th regular season NHL game.

References 

1974 births
Living people
Sportspeople from Trois-Rivières
National Hockey League officials
Ice hockey people from Quebec